Sportklub Slovan Hütteldorfer Athletikclub Wien is an Austrian football club located in Hütteldorf, Vienna, Austria.

History
Sk Slovan HAC was founded on 11 January 1902 as  Sportovni Klub Slovan ve Vídni - better known as SK Slovan - by the Czech minority in Vienna. They were promoted to the Austrian First Division in 1923, and built a new stadium - the České srdce (now known as the Generali Arena). The stadium was so large that it caused the club financial problems.

The club was relegated in 1928/29 season, but was in the first division again in 1930. They again achieved promotion to the first division in 1949/50 as AC Sparta. In 1960, the club merged with ÖMV Olympia 33 and the club was known as SK Slovan-Olympia. In 1976, they merged with Hütteldorfer AC founded in 1911, and was thereafter known as SK Slovan-Hütteldorfer AC. They have mostly played in the Wiener Stadtliga since the 1980s and 90s.

Colours and badge 
The club's original colours were green and red. Nowadays, their colours are blue, white, and red.

Honours and achievements 
Austrian Cup 
1x finalists: 1923/24
Austrian Bundesliga
1x 6th place: 1925/26
9x Participation: 1924–1929, 1931–1932, 1950
Austrian 2 Liga
4x champions: 1922/23, 1929/30, 1934/35, 1948/49
2x runners-up: 1944/45, 1945/46
2x third place: 1921/22, 1932/33
Austrian Regionalliga East
 1x champions: 1988
 1x runners-up: 1978/79

References

External links 
 Soccerway Profile
 WorldFootball Profile

Football clubs in Vienna
Association football clubs established in 1902
1902 establishments in Austria
Football clubs from former German territories
Football clubs in Austria
1902 establishments in Austria-Hungary